The Evergreen Greenies were a Minor League Baseball team based in Evergreen, Alabama, that played in the Alabama–Florida League from 1936 to 1938. They  were originally the Ozark Cardinals based in Ozark, Alabama before moving to Evergreen on Jun 29, 1937.

References

External links
Baseball Reference Ozark
Baseball Reference Evergreen

Baseball teams established in 1936
Baseball teams disestablished in 1938
Defunct minor league baseball teams
Professional baseball teams in Alabama
Defunct Alabama-Florida League teams
1936 establishments in Alabama
1938 disestablishments in Alabama
Defunct baseball teams in Alabama